Nikolaos "Nikos" Skiathitis (born 11 September 1981 in Volos) is a Greek rower.

References 
 
 

1981 births
Living people
Greek male rowers
Sportspeople from Volos
Rowers at the 2004 Summer Olympics
Olympic bronze medalists for Greece
Olympic rowers of Greece
Olympic medalists in rowing

World Rowing Championships medalists for Greece
Medalists at the 2004 Summer Olympics
Mediterranean Games gold medalists for Greece
Mediterranean Games medalists in rowing
Competitors at the 2005 Mediterranean Games